The Ford Model N is an automobile produced by Ford Motor Company; it was introduced in 1906 as a successor to the Models A and C as the company's inexpensive, entry-level line. It was built at the Ford Piquette Avenue Plant.  

The Model N diverged from its predecessors in that it was a front-engine car with a four-cylinder engine. The 15 hp straight-four drove the rear wheels via a long shaft. This was also the first American car to use vanadium steel.

A successful model, 7000 cars were made before production ended in 1908. At , the car was viewed as highly affordable at the time; by contrast, the high-volume Oldsmobile Runabout went for $650, Western's Gale Model A was $500, the Brush Runabout $485, the Black  $375, and the Success for $250. Maroon was the only factory color for the Model N.

Model R
The Model R was a higher trim level of the Model N with a larger body, wheels covered by full fenders, running boards, and oil lamps. Model R was $650, $150 above the $500 base Model N. The Model R was a 1907 model year offering, and 2500 were sold. Color was primarily dark green, with leather seats, brass fixtures, and a fuel tank holding .  Other differences from the Model N included 30-inch tires, a rounded trunk, and a McCord mechanical oiler, rather than the Model N-style exhaust pressure oiler.

Model S

Two Model S styles were produced, a runabout and a roadster.  The S runabout first appeared late in the 1907 model year, and was similar to the Model R, selling for $50 less than the R, at $700.  Both models were sold for a short time before the R was discontinued for model/fiscal year 1908.  The S roadster, like the R, had fenders attached to running boards, and a mechanical oiler.  Differences from the R included Model N-style 28-inch tires and the pointed trunk. 

The Model S Roadster was based on the same chassis as models N, R, and S runabout before it.  Making its appearance during Ford fiscal/model year 1908, the S Roadster had an enclosed cowl, full fenders and fender aprons, and a third "rumble" seat.  Like R and S runabouts, the SR used a McCord pressure oiler.  Like Model R, the S Roadster was equipped with 30-inch tires.  The S Roadster and Model K Roadster were the last models produced during the summer of 1908 as Ford retooled and prepared for the advent of the Model T.  The S Roadster sold for $750. Extras such as a convertible top, gas lamps, and umbrella holders were available. 3,750 S Roadsters were sold between 1908 and 1909.

References

Further reading

 
 

Model N
Cars introduced in 1906
Brass Era vehicles
History of Detroit
Motor vehicles manufactured in the United States